Damián Genovese De Mello  (born 10 July 1978) is a Venezuelan actor and model.

Biography
Damián's first television role was in the telenovela Hoy te vi in 1998. After obtaining small roles in television, he ventured into modelling and worked as a fashion Model for various designers and commercials in France and Spain.

In 2008, he participated in the telenovela Torrente produced by Venevisión.

In 2012, he was cast as the main protagonist of the historical telenovela Guerreras y Centauros.

Telenovelas
 Hoy te Vi (1998) as Jorge Cuevas Miquelarena 
 Lejana como el viento (2002) as Diego
 Mujer con Pantalones (2005)
 Con toda el alma (2005-2006) as Sebastián Morelli 
 Voltea pa' que te enamores (2006-2007) as Gerson López 
 Torrente (2008) as  Sebastián Gabaldón Leal 
 Natalia del Mar (2011) as Ernesto Valderrama
 Guerreras y Centauros (2015) as Eneas Montoya
 Vivir para amar (2015-2016) as Rodrigo

Theater
 Soltero, Casado, Viudo y Divorciado

References

External links
 

Living people
1978 births
Venezuelan people of Uruguayan descent
Venezuelan male telenovela actors
Male actors from Caracas
21st-century Venezuelan male actors